Donald Alexander Sheff (born June 27, 1931) is an American former competition swimmer who represented the United States at the 1952 Summer Olympics in Helsinki.  He competed for the gold medal-winning U.S. team in the preliminary heats of the men's 4×200-meter freestyle relay.  Sheff did not receive a medal, however, because under the 1952 Olympic swimming rules, relay swimmers who did not compete in the event final were not medal-eligible.

See also
 List of Yale University people
 World record progression 4 × 100 metres freestyle relay
 World record progression 4 × 200 metres freestyle relay

References

1931 births
Living people
American male freestyle swimmers
Olympic swimmers of the United States
Sportspeople from Brooklyn
Swimmers at the 1952 Summer Olympics
Yale Bulldogs men's swimmers